Winifred Sadie Jeffrey, later Jordan (15 March 1920 – 13 April 2019), was an English athlete who competed at the 1938 British Empire Games, 1946 European Athletics Championships, and 1948 Summer Olympics.

She was born in Kings Norton, Birmingham.  She left school aged 14 to work at Dunlop, where her father was employed, and where she participated with the athletics club.

In the athletics at the 1938 British Empire Games in Sydney, she was a member of the English relay team which won the silver medal in the 220-110-220-110 yards event and the bronze medal in the 110-220-110 yards competition. In the 100 yards contest she was eliminated in the semi-finals.

Her athletics career was interrupted by the Second World War, and then she won silver medals in the 100 metres and 200 metres at the 1946 European Athletics Championships in Oslo, while her 4 × 100 metres relay team came fourth.  At the 1948 Summer Olympics in London, she was eliminated in the semi-finals of the women's 100 metres. Jordan died on 13 April 2019 at the age of 99.

References

External links
Profile at TOPS in athletics

1920 births
2019 deaths
English female sprinters
Athletes (track and field) at the 1938 British Empire Games
Commonwealth Games silver medallists for England
Commonwealth Games bronze medallists for England
Olympic athletes of Great Britain
Athletes (track and field) at the 1948 Summer Olympics
Commonwealth Games medallists in athletics
Olympic female sprinters
Medallists at the 1938 British Empire Games